The Ladies' Purse is a Group 3 Thoroughbred handicap horse race in Hong Kong, run at Sha Tin over 1800 metres in October.

It is one of the oldest-established races in Hong Kong, after which a gold coin in a wallet will be presented to the winning jockey, owner and trainer by a renowned lady.

Winners

See also
 List of Hong Kong horse races

References 
Racing Post:
The Hong Kong Jockey Club - Official website of Sa Sa Ladies' Purse (2011/12)
 Racing Information of Sa Sa Ladies' Purse (2011/12)
 The Hong Kong Jockey Club 

Horse races in Hong Kong
Recurring sporting events established in 1981
1981 establishments in Hong Kong